The Segunda Federación is the third tier of the Spanish women's football league system, beginning with the 2022–23 season.

With a format of two regionalised groups, it is the female equivalent of the men's Primera Federación and is run by the Royal Spanish Football Federation.

History
On 24 July 2018, the Royal Spanish Football Federation agreed to create a new second division between the Primera División, featuring 16 teams, and the Segunda División, in which 112 teams were involved.

In its first season, the league was to be contested by 32 teams divided into two groups: two teams relegated from the 2018–19 Primera División and the 30 best teams from the 2018–19 Segunda División.

In July 2019, the new second tier was renamed as Segunda División Pro being later re-branded as Reto Iberdrola for sponsorship reasons. The level below which had carried that name previously recovered its former name of Primera Nacional.

On 10 June 2020, the Segunda División was granted professionalized league status.

In early 2022, it was confirmed that the league structure would be altered again, after only three seasons: the existing Primera División would be a standalone professional league of 16 teams, the second tier would be a single nationwide 16-team division known as the Primera Federación, the existing Segunda División Pro with two regionalised groups (32 teams) would become the third tier and be named the Segunda Federación, and the existing Primera Nacional division of 96 teams (six regionalised 16-team groups) would become the fourth tier. These levels would be administered by the RFEF and more closely resemble the men's post-2021 structure, albeit only one professional league and six fourth-tier groups rather than five.

Format
The 32 teams are divided into two groups according to geographical criteria. The two group winners promote directly to Primera Federación.

2022–23 teams

References

External links
Royal Spanish Football Federation 

 
2
Spain